Albert IV (before 1363 - 24/31 December 1388) was Duke of Mecklenburg from 1383 to 1388.

Life
He was the son of the Duke Henry III of Mecklenburg and Ingeborg of Denmark.

Albert was also a claimant to the Danish throne after the death of King Valdemar IV, but Olaf II succeeded instead.

After his father Henry died in 1383, Albert ruled Mecklenburg jointly with his uncles Albert III and Magnus I and his cousin John IV.

He was married to Elisabeth of Holstein, the daughter of Nicholas, Count of Holstein-Rendsburg and died in December 1388. In 1404 his widow Elisabeth married Duke Eric V of Saxe-Lauenburg.

References

External links 
 Genealogical table of the House of Mecklenburg
 www.mittelalter-genealogie.de

Dukes of Mecklenburg
14th-century German nobility
14th-century births
1388 deaths
Pretenders to the Danish throne